The Deadly Companions is a 1961 American Western and war film directed by Sam Peckinpah and starring Maureen O'Hara, Brian Keith, Steve Cochran, and Chill Wills. Based on the novel of the same name by A. S. Fleischman, the film is about an ex-army soldier who accidentally kills a woman's son, and tries to make up for it by escorting the funeral procession through dangerous Indian territory. The Deadly Companions was Sam Peckinpah's motion picture directorial debut.

Plot
After her young son is killed in a bank robbery, the widowed dance-hall hostess Kit Tilden (Maureen O'Hara) is determined to bury him beside his father in Siringo, now deserted and located in Apache territory. Yellowleg (Brian Keith), the ex-army Northern sergeant who accidentally killed her son, decides to help take the body across the desert to be buried, whether Kit wants help or not. He forces the other two bank robbers - Turk, a Confederate deserter; and Billy, a gunslinger - to accompany them.

After Billy attacks Kit, Yellowleg throws him out of their camp. Turk then deserts. Yellowleg and Kit become closer during the journey to Siringo. After arriving at the long abandoned settlement, they discover that Turk and Billy have followed them, leading to a gunfight among the three men.

Cast

 Maureen O'Hara as Kit Tilden
 Brian Keith as Yellowleg
 Steve Cochran as Billy Keplinger
 Chill Wills as Turk
 Strother Martin as Parson
 Will Wright as Doctor Acton
 Jim O'Hara as Cal, General Store
 Peter O'Crotty as Mayor of Hila City
 Billy Vaughan as Mead Tilden Jr.
 Big John Hamilton as gambler (uncredited)

Production

Directorial debut
After the cancellation of his 1960 television series The Westerner, Brian Keith was cast as the male lead in The Deadly Companions. He suggested Sam Peckinpah (the producer and director of The Westerner) as the director for this film, and producer Charles B. Fitzsimons accepted the idea. By most accounts, the low-budget film shot on location in Arizona was a learning process for Peckinpah. Unable to rewrite the screenplay or edit the picture, Peckinpah vowed to never again direct a film unless he had script control. 

The Deadly Companions passed largely without notice and is the least known of Peckinpah's films.

In her memoir 'Tis Herself (2004), Maureen O'Hara complained about Peckinpah's behavior on-set, saying that he "didn't have a clue how to direct a movie" and was "one of the strangest and most objectionable people I had ever worked with".

Cast and crew
Charles B. Fitzsimons (1924–2001), a former actor, was Maureen O'Hara's younger brother. In addition to his listing as producer, the film's opening credits indicate "song by Marlin Skiles & Charles B. Fitzsimons; sung by Maureen O'Hara" (the title of the song, which is heard through the entire length of the opening credits, is not specified). Another younger brother, Jim O'Hara (1927–1992), played the seventh-billed role of Cal (the family surname is Fitzsimons, also rendered as FitzSimons).

Leading man Brian Keith who was the star of Sam Peckinpah's 1960 TV series The Westerner, was also Maureen O'Hara's co-star in The Parent Trap which they completed immediately before The Deadly Companions and which premiered on June 12, 1961, six days after the Tucson premiere of The Deadly Companions. They re-teamed for one additional film, 1966's The Rare Breed, which top-billed James Stewart. Cinematographer William H. Clothier also worked on The Rare Breed as well as two other films with Maureen O'Hara, 1963's McLintock! and 1971's Big Jake, both starring John Wayne.

Filming locations
 Old Tucson Studios, 201 S. Kinney Road, Tucson, Arizona, USA
 Philippines

See also
 List of American films of 1961

References
Citations

Further reading

External links

The Deadly Companions at TV Guide (revised and updated version of 1987 write-up originally published in The Motion Picture Guide)

1960 Western (genre) films
1960 directorial debut films
1960 films
American Western (genre) films
Articles containing video clips
Astor Pictures films
1960s English-language films
Films about bank robbery
Films based on American novels
Films based on Western (genre) novels
Films directed by Sam Peckinpah
Revisionist Western (genre) films
1960s American films